Moonwalk National High School (Filipino: Mataas na Paaralang Pambansa ng Moonwalk/Mataas na Paaralang Nasyonal ng Moonwalk) (MwNHS/MNHS) is a public high school located at St. Mary's Street cor. Daang Batang Street, San Agustin Village, Barangay Moonwalk, Parañaque, Philippines. It was built in 2005 as an annex of the Dr. Arcadio Santos National High School, with Dr. Gregorio Capiral as the first principal. In 2009, the city government decided to make it a separate school from being an annex school, and was renamed Moonwalk High School. In 2010, it attained national status, and was renamed Moonwalk National High School. 

It offers public schooling for the residents of Brgy. Moonwalk as well as for those living near it. It is recognised by the Department of Education. MNHS is the second largest high school in School District II, and is the fifth largest school in the Division of Parañaque.

References 

Educational institutions established in 2005
High schools in Metro Manila
Schools in Parañaque
2005 establishments in the Philippines